The 2021–22 season was the 20th season in the existence of Oud-Heverlee Leuven and its second consecutive season in the top flight of Belgian football. In addition to the domestic league, Oud-Heverlee Leuven participated in this season's edition of the Belgian Cup.

Players
This section lists players who were in Oud-Heveree Leuven's first team squad at any point during the 2021–22 season and appeared at least once on the match sheet (possibly as unused substitute)
The symbol ℒ indicates a player who is on loan from another club
The symbol ¥ indicates a youngster

Did not appear on match sheet
The following players were listed as part of Oud-Heveree Leuven's first team squad during the 2021–22 season, but never appeared on the match sheet

Transfers

Pre-season and friendlies

Competitions

Overall record

First Division A

League table

Results summary

Results by round

Matches
The league fixtures were announced on 8 June 2021.

Belgian Cup

References

Oud-Heverlee Leuven
OH Leuven